Refunding occurs when an entity that has issued callable bonds calls those debt securities from the debt holders with the express purpose of reissuing new debt at a lower coupon rate. In essence, the issue of new, lower-interest debt allows the company to prematurely refund the older, higher-interest debt. 

On the contrary, NonRefundable Bonds may be callable but they cannot be re-issued with a lower coupon rate. i.e. They cannot be refunded.

See also
Refinancing

Bonds (finance)